Hanabad may refer to:
 Çardak, Turkey
 Henabad (disambiguation), Iran